Encelia actoni, also known by the common names Acton brittlebush and Acton encelia, is a species of flowering plant in the family Asteraceae.

It is sometimes misspelled Encelia actonii.

Distribution and habitat
The plant is native to southern California and neighboring areas of Nevada in the U.S. and Baja California in México.  It grows in various types of open habitat, including deserts, chaparral, and grasslands.

It is found in the Mojave Desert, Sonoran Deserts, Peninsular Ranges, Transverse Ranges, San Joaquin Valley, and southern Sierra Nevada.

The species was named for the community of Acton in Southern California, located in an ecotone of the Mojave Desert ecoregion and of the montane chaparral and woodlands in the San Gabriel Mountains.

Description

Encelia actoni is a multi−branched perennial shrub, reaching  in height. The branches are lined with oval to roughly triangular leaves a few centimeters long, that are gray-green and woolly in texture.

The inflorescence is a solitary daisylike flower head  in diameter, on a tall, erect peduncle. The head has a center of many yellow disc florets surrounded by up to 25 yellow ray florets. It blooms in the Spring.

The fruit is an achene about half a centimeter long, usually lacking a pappus. It reseeds well.

Cultivation
Encelia actoni is cultivated as an ornamental plant for drought tolerant and wildlife gardens, natural landscaping design, and habitat restoration projects. It needs sun and after the first summer, very limited to no supplemental irrigation.

It is a honey plant, supporting diverse pollinators. The plant has a low fuel load, and so has fire retardant qualities in wildfire zones.

References

External links

Encelia actoni — U.C. CalPhoto gallery

actoni
Flora of Baja California
Flora of California
Flora of Nevada
Flora of the California desert regions
Flora of the Sierra Nevada (United States)
Flora of the Sonoran Deserts
Natural history of the California chaparral and woodlands
Natural history of the Central Valley (California)
Natural history of the Colorado Desert
Natural history of the Mojave Desert
Natural history of the Peninsular Ranges
Natural history of the Santa Monica Mountains
Natural history of the Transverse Ranges
Plants used in traditional Native American medicine
Drought-tolerant plants
Garden plants of North America
Flora without expected TNC conservation status